Liu Guozhi (born November 1960) is a lieutenant general in the People's Liberation Army of China, and an academician of the Chinese Academy of Sciences. He is a member of the 19th Central Committee of the Chinese Communist Party. He is a representative of the 19th National Congress of the Chinese Communist Party.

Biography
Liu was born in Jin County (now Linghai), Liaoning, in November 1960. He earned a bachelor's degree in 1983, a master's degree in 1986, and a doctor's degree in 1992, all from Tsinghua University.

He worked at Northwest Institute of Nuclear Technology between 1986 and 2002, what he was deputy commander and commander of China Nuclear Test Base. In December 2010, he rose to become deputy head of the People's Liberation Army General Armaments Department. In September 2014, he became director of its Science and Technology Committee, replacing Li Andong. In January 2016, he became chairperson of the Science and Technology Committee of the Central Military Commission, and held that office until 2021.

Honours and awards
 2009 Member of the Chinese Academy of Sciences (CAS)

References

1968 births
Living people
People from Jinzhou
Tsinghua University alumni
People's Liberation Army generals from Liaoning
Members of the Chinese Academy of Sciences
Members of the 19th Central Committee of the Chinese Communist Party